Kevin John Milne  (born 18 March 1949) is a New Zealand television presenter, best known for hosting the show Fair Go from 1983 to 2010.

Fair Go 

Milne has been part of Fair Go since 1983, the show first starting in 1977. He is known for a confrontational style and asking difficult questions.

Milne announced his retirement mid-2010 and his last show (the 2010 Fair Go Ad Awards) screened live on 20 October 2010.

Other programmes 
He has also worked on the following programmes:
 BBC-TV
 Visnews
 Production Line
 Then Again
 Holiday
 Kev Can Do

In 2009 Milne appeared on the New Zealand travel programme Intrepid Journeys with a trip made to Ukraine in December 2008-January 2009.

Honours and awards 
In the 2007 Queen's Birthday Honours, Milne was appointed an Officer of the New Zealand Order of Merit, for services to broadcasting and the community.

He also won two Qantas Media Awards for Best Presenter.

Personal life
Milne lives in the Kapiti Coast near Wellington. He had a valve replacement as part of heart surgery in October 2004, and was diagnosed with a brain tumour in mid-2009, which required surgery the following year. In September 2020, Milne announced that he had been diagnosed with prostate cancer.

Milne is a former student of St Bede's College, Christchurch.

See also
 List of New Zealand television personalities

References 

1949 births
Living people
New Zealand television presenters
Officers of the New Zealand Order of Merit
People educated at St Bede's College, Christchurch